Silver Mount Cemetery is located at 918 Victory Boulevard on Staten Island, New York, United States. It was originally named Cooper Cemetery around 1866. It covers about 17 acres.

Notable burials
 William Duer (1805–1879), US Congressman.
 Kelvin Martin (1964–1987), known to the underworld as 50 Cent, was a New York City criminal known as the supposed inspiration for the name of the famous rapper, 50 Cent.
 Mary Ewing Outerbridge (1852–1886), who imported tennis into the US.
 Trixie Smith (1885–1943), blues singer during the classic female blues period.
 Wallace Thurman (1902–1934), writer.
 Fay Tincher (1884–1983), actress.
 William Winter (1836–1917), American dramatic critic and author.

References

External links
 

Cemeteries in Staten Island